Vitus Piluzzi, O.F.M. Conv. (died 6 January 1704) was a Roman Catholic prelate who served as Titular Archbishop of Marcianopolis (1678–1704).

Biography
Vitus Piluzzi was ordained a priest in the Order of Friars Minor Conventual. On 5 September 1678, he was appointed during the papacy of Pope Innocent XI as Titular Archbishop of Marcianopolis. On 18 September 1678, he was consecrated bishop by Alessandro Crescenzi (cardinal), Bishop of Recanati e Loreto, with Domenico Gianuzzi, Titular Bishop of Dioclea in Phrygia, and Bartolomeo Menatti, Bishop of Lodi, serving as co-consecrators. He served as Titular Archbishop of Marcianopolis until his death on 6 January 1704.

While bishop, he was the principal co-consecrator of Giaconto Tuartkovich, Bishop of Ston.

References

External links and additional sources
  (for Chronology of Bishops) 
  (for Chronology of Bishops) 

17th-century Roman Catholic titular archbishops
18th-century Roman Catholic titular archbishops
Bishops appointed by Pope Innocent XI
1704 deaths
Conventual Franciscan bishops